Daniel Coakley may refer to:

 Daniel Coakley (swimmer) (born 1989), Filipino-American swimmer
 Daniel H. Coakley (1865–1952), American political figure and lawyer
 Daniel H. Coakley Jr. (1906–1964), American politician